Good Hope is an unincorporated community in Holmes County, Mississippi, United States.

History
Good Hope is named for the Good Hope plantation. Colonel William R. Miles, who commanded Miles' Legion at the Siege of Port Hudson and the Battle of Plains Store, lived on the Good Hope plantation.

Good Hope is located on the Canadian National Railway.

A post office operated under the name Good Hope from 1910 to 1916.

Marion Post Wolcott documented people and scenes from the Good Hope plantation in October 1939 as part of her work with the Farm Security Administration.

References

Unincorporated communities in Holmes County, Mississippi
Unincorporated communities in Mississippi